Magenta Software was a video game developer based in Liverpool, England.

History
It was founded in 1994. In recent years it has specialized in the production of Buzz Controller-based party games. These games have proven successful winning several awards and going on from their initial European release territories to be released in North America.

List of Games

Awards
In October 2007, Magenta Software won the Children's Jury Giga Maus award for Buzz! Junior: Robo Jam and, a month later, won a British Academy Children's BAFTA for Buzz! Junior: Jungle Party.

References 

Defunct video game companies of the United Kingdom
Video game development companies
Video game companies established in 1994
1994 establishments in England
Companies based in Liverpool
British companies established in 1994